Litquake is San Francisco's annual literary festival. Originally named Litstock, the festival events took place in a single day in Golden Gate Park in the spring of 1999. It now has a two-week run in mid-October, as well as year-round programs and workshops.

Litquake consists of readings, discussions, film screenings, and themed events held at hundreds of Bay Area venues, in an attempt to bring as many disparate types of literary art to as many people as possible. The festival now features over 100 events and around 600 authors, and draws over 21,000 attendees annually. In 2021, 96% of all events were free and open to the public.

History 
Jack Boulware and Jane Ganahl are the co-founders and operate the festival as Executive Director and Artistic Director.

Hatched over beers at the Edinburgh Castle pub in 1999, Litquake debuted as "Litstock" a free one-day reading series in a fog-bound Golden Gate Park. In 2002, the festival was rechristened Litquake and began expanding its programming to include writing from around the world. In 2004, the festival inaugurated a closing night literary pub crawl (Lit Crawl) throughout San Francisco's Mission District.

In the years following, Litquake added more national and international authors, youth programs (Kidquake), workshops for the elderly (Elder Project), a podcast (Lit Cast Live), and special localized editions of the Lit Crawl held each year in Austin, Seattle, Minneapolis, New York City, Los Angeles, Portland, Boston, Chicago, Kells (Ireland), Cheltenham (England), Angers (France), Naples (Italy), and Wellington (New Zealand) with more being added every year.

Litquake is now the largest independent literary festival on the West Coast.

Litquake began hosting online programs in 2020.

Notable author appearances over the years

Chris Adrian
Hilton Als
Daniel Alarcón
Isabel Allende
Rabih Alameddine
Jonathan Ames
Nicholson Baker
Elif Batuman
Peter S. Beagle
Lewis Black
Michael Ian Black
T.C. Boyle
NoViolet Bulawayo
Michael Chabon
Vikram Chandra
Jeff Chang
Emma Cline
Natalie Diaz
Emma Donoghue
John Doe
Steve Earle
Dave Eggers
James Ellroy
Akwaeke Emezi
Jeffrey Eugenides 
Lawrence Ferlinghetti
Ben Fong-Torres
Karen Joy Fowler
John Freeman
Mary Gaitskill
Julia Glass
Andrew Sean Greer
Yaa Gyasi
Robert Haas
Chelsea Handler
Daniel Handler (Lemony Snicket)
Joy Harjo
Chinaka Hodge
Juan Felipe Herrera
Adam Johnson
Denis Johnson
Piper Kerman
Warren Hinckle
Maxine Hong Kingston
Chuck Klosterman
Michael Krasny
Rachel Kushner
Victor LaValle
Yiyun Li
Tao Lin
Édouard Louis
Jonathan Lethem
Ray Manzarek
Armistead Maupin
Marc Maron
Joyce Maynard
Michael McClure
Thomas McGuane 
Christopher Moore
Maggie Nelson
Joyce Carol Oates
Chinelo Okparanta
ZZ Packer
Raj Patel
Tom Perrotta
Anne Perry
Michael Pollan
D.A. Powell
Boots Riley
Mary Roach 
Karen Russell 
Ishmael Reed
Sonia Sanchez
George Saunders
Adam Savage
Will Self
Jane Smiley
Patti Smith
Tracy K. Smith
Rebecca Solnit
Ron Stallworth
Susan Straight
Amber Tamblyn
Amy Tan
Michelle Tea
Jose Antonio Vargas
Loudon Wainwright III
Tom Waits
Esmé Weijun Wang
Irvine Welsh
Colson Whitehead
Tobias Wolff
Al Young

Lit Crawl 
In 2004, Litquake launched its first “Lit Crawl,” a literary pub-crawl through the Mission District of San Francisco. Readings and performances were rolled out in three sequential phases over the course of the crawl. In 2005, the crawl closed the festival, a place in the schedule it has maintained ever since. By 2018 the Lit Crawl had expanded to over 100 venues, including bars, cafes, bookstores, theaters, galleries, clothing boutiques, furniture showrooms, parking lots, a laundromat and a bee-keeping store.

The New York Times wrote about the crawl in "In San Francisco, Literature as Carnival" and again in 2013 in an article entitled "A Heady Cocktail of Books and Booze" about Lit Crawl in New York City's Lower East Side.

Other crawls have been added over the years: Lit Crawl NYC debuted in 2008; Lit Crawl Austin in 2011 as a part of Texas Book Festival; Lit Crawl Brooklyn and Lit Crawl Seattle in 2012. Lit Crawl Iowa City and Lit Crawl Los Angeles 2013. Lit Crawl London, Lit Crawl Portland (Portland Book Festival), and Lit Crawl Boston (Boston Book Festival) was added in 2014.  Since 2015, Lit Crawl NYC is a project of Litquake and PEN America, a global community of more than 4,400 writers, translators, and literary professionals dedicated to protecting free expression and promoting literary culture.

Kidquake, Teenquake, and Elder Project

Kidquake 
The annual Kidquake events bring over 800 K-5 students from 34 classes to the San Francisco Public Library for two days of assemblies and intimate workshops with acclaimed children’s authors, and hundreds of free books and giveaways.

In 20202, Litquake released "virtual classroom visit" videos direct to teachers for use in the classroom. These pre-recorded videos featured authors' presentations paired with writing, illustration, and book-making prompts. Teaching materials were made available for download.

Teenquake 
Teenquake partnerships with San Francisco Public Library, NaNoWriMo Young Writer’s Project, and Writopia Labs inspire young writers through public readings and open mics, literary crawls, and awards events. 2018’s Teen Writing Awards brought in 225 entries with ten of the teens featured at an awards ceremony for family and friends during Lit Crawl SF.

Elder Project 
Now in its fourth year and serving multiple sites, the Elder Project brings writing and storytelling workshops to retirement communities across Oakland and San Francisco. After two months of opening new pathways to self-expression and greater socialization, each class publishes an anthology and performs at a live reading for friends and loved ones. The program has even helped several emerging writers to publish their work, perform in local reading series, and even launch careers.

Lit Cast Live! 
With 164,000 downloads and listeners in over 100 countries, Lit Cast brings select Litquake programming to an enormous, worldwide audience. In 2018, through partnerships with local bookstores and arts organizations, Litquake began broadcasting both emerging and award-winning authors on book tours, as well as various special events.

Barbary Coast Award (2007-2016) 

Initiated in 2007, Litquake’s Barbary Coast Award is given for literary achievement and in recognition of those who value the independent—and sometimes unruly—the spirit of the Bay Area and keep it alive in their work. Its name is meant to evoke San Francisco’s storied pirate and nonconformist beginnings as well as a nod to Armistead Maupin’s quixotic characters who made their home on Barbary Lane.  Recipients through 2016:

 2007: Armistead Maupin
 2008: Tobias Wolff
 2009: Amy Tan
 2010: Lawrence Ferlinghetti/City Lights Books
 2011: Ishmael Reed
 2012: Poetry Flash
 2013: Ron Turner & Last Gasp Comics
 2014: 826 Valencia with Dave Eggers and Vendela Vida
2015: Community of Writers at Squaw Valley
2016: Maxine Hong Kingston, Alejandro Murguia, Thomas Sanchez, Jewelle Gomez, Michael Krasny, The Threepenny Review, The Bancroft Library, Paul Yamazaki, and Justin Chin.

See also 

List of San Francisco Bay Area writers

References

External links
 Litquake website
 Article on 2007 Litquake and Lit Crawl
 LitMinds interviews the Litquake Organizers 
 Ashcan Magazine's coverage of Litquake 2009
 Reyhan Harmanci, "Readers and Bookworms, Your Days Are Coming", New York Times, September 23, 2011
 Allison McCarthy, "Pop Culture Know-It-All & Litquake Performer Chuck Klosterman Talks Beards, Crystals and Writer's Block", 7x7 magazine, September 28, 2011
 "Litquake San Francisco: Your Ultimate Guide To Navigating Literary Takeover (Photos)", HuffPost San Francisco, June 10, 2011

Culture of San Francisco
Festivals in the San Francisco Bay Area
Literary festivals in the United States
Recurring events established in 1999
1999 establishments in California
Non-profit organizations based in San Francisco
Organizations based in San Francisco